Phausina is a genus of Asian jumping spiders that was first described by Eugène Louis Simon in 1902.

Male P. leucopogon have a black carapace, red hairs surrounding a broad band of yellow hairs on the head, and reddish hairs surrounding a narrow median stripe of whitish hairs on the thorax with a wavy whitish stripe on the side. The abdomen is black-ish with red pubescence and a median white and yellow band. The first two pairs of legs are dark, the others yellowish with rings.

Species
 it contains four species, found only in Asia:
Phausina bivittata Simon, 1902 – Sri Lanka
Phausina flavofrenata Simon, 1902 (type) – Sri Lanka
Phausina guttipes Simon, 1902 – Sri Lanka
Phausina leucopogon Simon, 1905 – Indonesia (Java)

References

External links
 Drawings of the palp of P. flavofrenata

Salticidae genera
Salticidae
Spiders of Asia
Taxa named by Eug%C3%A8ne Simon